Jean-Pierre Brits (born 2 April 1991 in Gauteng) is a South African professional squash player. As of February 2018, he was ranked number 208 in the world, and number 2 in South Africa. He won the 2018 Gauteng Open professional PSA tournament.

References

1991 births
Living people
South African male squash players
21st-century South African people